Nguyễn Tiến Trung (born 4 July 1962) is a Vietnamese sports shooter. He competed in two events at the 1980 Summer Olympics.

References

External links
 

1962 births
Living people
Vietnamese male sport shooters
Olympic shooters of Vietnam
Shooters at the 1980 Summer Olympics
Place of birth missing (living people)